

Australia

Regular telecasts of the later stages of the Australian championships in Australia began in the mid 1960s. Channel 2 broadcast the 1965, 1966, 1968, 1970 and 1971 events. Channel 9 broadcast the 1969 event. From 1973 to 2018, the Seven Network served as the host broadcaster of the Australian Open. In March 2018, it was announced that the Nine Network had acquired the rights to the tournament beginning in 2020, for a period of five years. The network later bought the rights for the 2019 tournament as well. The Open's broadcast rights are lucrative in the country, as it occurs near the end of the Summer non-ratings season — which gives its broadcaster opportunities to promote their upcoming programming lineup.

Below is a list of men's singles commentators for the host broadcaster.

Europe

In United Kingdom the tournament was broadcast on Eurosport in 1990 and has been broadcast on Eurosport since 1995 (from 1991 to 1994 Sky covered the event). BBC covered the finals live from 1995 to 2015 (they also covered the final stages of the event in 1989). The BBC dropped its live coverage of the 2016 tournament just a month before the start due to budget cuts (they now show highlights only), leaving Eurosport as the exclusive live broadcaster. Commentators for Eurosport in the UK include Simon Reed, Chris Bradnam, Nick Lester, Barry Millns, Pete Odgers, Jo Durie, Frew McMillan, Annabel Croft, Arvind Parmar and Chris Wilkinson. Other broadcasters in Europe have included SRG in Switzerland, NOS in Netherlands and RTS in Serbia. while in the 1970s/early 80s ITV covered it as recorded highlights on World of Sport

Other countries

Elsewhere, beIN Sports broadcasts it into the Middle East and Northern Africa, and SuperSport in Sub-Sahara Africa. In the United States, the tournament is broadcast on ESPN2, ESPN3 and the Tennis Channel. The championship matches are televised live on ESPN.  While it is broadcast on ESPN International in Central and Latin America. It is broadcast on TSN in Canada.

In Asia-Pacific region, the tournament is broadcast on five television networks in China, including national broadcaster CCTV, provincial networks Beijing TV, Shanghai TV and Guangdong TV and English language Star Sports, as well as online on IQIYI Sports. Elsewhere in the region, it is broadcast in Japan by national broadcaster NHK, and pay-TV network WOWOW. In the Indian Sub-continent, Sony Six has broadcast since 2015 and, in the rest of Asia, it is broadcast on Fox Sports Asia until the network's shutdown in 2021.

IMG (company)'s Sport 24 has the inflight and in ship broadcast rights.

United States

Notes
The 1978 tournament was a part of a series of "eight syndicated telecasts", produced by the independent Hughes Sports Network and sold a commercial stations on an individual market basis by Taft Broadcasting. Six more tournaments are scheduled on Hughes: the Italian and French Opens, Washington Star International, Canadian Open, U.S. Pro Championships and U.S. Open, all slotted for 6 to 8 p.m. Saturdays and 5 to 7 p.m. Sundays, Eastern time.

ESPN/ESPN2 had exclusive coverage from 1984 - 2007. Beginning in 2008, ESPN2 shared the broadcast duties with Tennis Channel.

See also
Tennis on television
Tennis_on_ESPN#Announcers
Tennis_Channel#On-air_personalities
Nine%27s Wide World of Sports#Tennis
Seven_Sport#Tennis
BBC_Sport#Tennis

References

External links
Tennis: Australian Open - Awful Announcing
Broadcast Partners | Australian Open

ESPN2
ESPN
Seven Sport
Nine's Wide World of Sport
BBC Sport
Lists of tennis commentators
BeIN Sports
broadcasters